José Daniel Ortiz Santos  (born June 13, 1977) is a former professional baseball player. He played in Major League Baseball (MLB) for the Oakland Athletics and Colorado Rockies and in Nippon Professional Baseball (NPB) for the Orix Buffaloes, Chiba Lotte Marines, Fukuoka SoftBank Hawks, and Saitama Seibu Lions.

Career

Early career and MLB debut
That earned him a September call-up to the majors, where he played in seven games for Oakland.

2001: Becoming a major league regular
Before the 2001 season, Baseball America ranked him the best prospect in Oakland's farm system and the 34th-best prospect in baseball.

Ortiz started the year in Oakland, but was returned to the minor leagues two weeks later after batting .179 in his first 11 games. After a second brief call-up in May Ortiz was traded to the Colorado Rockies on July 25 as part of a package that brought Jermaine Dye to Oakland. Ortiz was installed as the Rockies starting second baseman, replacing Todd Walker (who had been traded to the Cincinnati Reds). Ortiz batted .255 the rest of the way, with 13 home runs in just 204 at bats in 53 games.

2002: Sophomore slump?
Ortiz opened the  season as the Rockies' starter at second again, but his power numbers declined substantially. By mid-June, while he was hitting .244, Ortiz had just one home run through the same number of games (53) in which he'd hit 13 home runs the year before. Ortiz was sent down to the Triple-A Colorado Springs Sky Sox and was replaced at second by Brent Butler. After hitting .333 with 6 home runs in 26 minor league games, Ortiz was brought back up in September. He hit .281 in 12 games down the stretch, but failed to hit a home run the rest of the year.

Off to Japan
Ortiz was not offered a contract by the Rockies after the season, and rather than catch on with another major league club, Ortiz signed with the Orix BlueWave of the Japanese Pacific League. On March 28, Ortiz hit a home run in his first at bat in Japan, and on May 3 he hit for the cycle against the Seibu Lions. He finished 2003 with 33 home runs for the BlueWave, batting .255 and driving in 86 runs in 127 games.

However, his power totals declined, as he dropped to 24 home runs in 128 games.

Independent ball and back to Japan
Without a team in Japan or the majors, Ortiz signed with the Lancaster Barnstormers of the Atlantic League of Professional Baseball. In , Ortiz returned to Japan with the Chiba Lotte Marines, where he batted .309 with 7 home runs in 67 games. His contract was not renewed by the Marines, and so he started the season as a free agent. In May, the Fukuoka SoftBank Hawks came calling, needing a power bat in the lineup to protect aging left-handed slugger Nobuhiko Matsunaka.

References

External links

Japanese baseball statistics

1977 births
Living people
Acereros de Monclova players
Arizona League Athletics players
Chiba Lotte Marines players
Colorado Rockies players
Colorado Springs Sky Sox players
Dominican Republic expatriate baseball players in Canada
Dominican Republic expatriate baseball players in Japan
Dominican Republic expatriate baseball players in Mexico
Dominican Republic expatriate baseball players in the United States
Fukuoka SoftBank Hawks players
Huntsville Stars players
Lancaster Barnstormers players
Major League Baseball players from the Dominican Republic
Major League Baseball second basemen
Mexican League baseball right fielders
Mexican League baseball second basemen
Mexican League baseball third basemen
Modesto A's players
Nippon Professional Baseball infielders
Oakland Athletics players
Orix BlueWave players
Pacific Coast League MVP award winners
Sacramento River Cats players
Saitama Seibu Lions players
Saraperos de Saltillo players
Vancouver Canadians players